The McGary Islands is a small coastal island group in Avannaata municipality, off NW Greenland.

The islands are named after James McGary of the Second Grinnell Expedition. They are a breeding ground for the common eider.

Geography
The McGary Islands are a cluster of coastal islands, islets and rocks at the southern end of Peabody Bay about 6 km off Cape Agassiz and off the southern end of the Humboldt Glacier. The islands are small and are located close to the shore of Inglefield Land, 15 km to the NE of the Bonsall Islands.

See also 
 List of islands of Greenland

References

External links 
Explanatory notes to the Geological map of Greenland

Uninhabited islands of Greenland